Real Comedy (Ukraine) is a Ukrainian stand-up comedy television show.

The show was created by former members of the Comedy Club UA and Comedy Club Andriy Molochny and Anton Lirnyk who are known for their performance as a comic-duo "Chekhov's duet". The project is part of the Comedy Club Production initiatives that established the Comedy Club in Moscow followed by several spin-offs across the territory of the former Soviet Union including Ukraine.

The new project conducts the battle of candidates providing the current rating for each performer (individual or collective).

Residents
 Duo "DiCh – the Duet in honour of Chekhov" (Andriy Molochny and Anton Lirnyk)
 Duo "Love" (Katya and Seryozha)
 Yevhen Bozhestveny
 Duo "T.V.U.Z." (Bohdan "Baian" and Frank)
 Duo "Chornoslyv" (Val and Billy)
 Duo "Vorner Brothers" (Rutem de Niro and Oleksandr Viktorovych)
 Galust
 Duo "Of small and middle business" (Mykyta "Arystokrat" and "That one, what's his name")
 Igor Shmigar (Igor Gvedde) - costumed stand-up

See also
Faina Yukraina

References

External links
 Официальная страница Real Comedy
 Официальная страница Real Comedy

Ukrainian comedy television series
1+1 Media Group